William Jay Warner (January 24, 1881 – February 12, 1944) was an American football player and coach.  Warner graduated from Cornell University in 1903 and was a member of the Sphinx Head Society.  He was elected to the College Football Hall of Fame in 1971.

Following his playing career at Cornell University, Warner was the head football coach at Cornell University, the University of North Carolina, Colgate University, St. Louis University, and the University of Oregon.  He also coached football at Sherman Institute—now known as Sherman Indian High School—in Riverside, California.

Warner was the brother of famed football coach Pop Warner. In 1902, Bill and Glenn both played pro football for the Syracuse Athletic Club during the first World Series of Football, held at Madison Square Garden. It was during this event, that Warner played in the first professional indoor football game as his Syracuse squad upset the heavily favored "New York" team. While Glenn was injured during the event with a head injury, Bill and the rest of the Syracuse team went on to win the event.

Head coaching record

College

References

Additional sources
 
 
 McCann, Michael C. (1995). Oregon Ducks Football: 100 Years of Glory. Eugene, OR: McCann Communications Corp. .

External links
 
 

1881 births
1944 deaths
19th-century players of American football
American football guards
Colgate Raiders football coaches
Cornell Big Red football coaches
Cornell Big Red football players
North Carolina Tar Heels football coaches
Oregon Ducks football coaches
Saint Louis Billikens football coaches
Syracuse Athletic Association players
High school football coaches in California
All-American college football players
College Football Hall of Fame inductees
People from Springville, New York
Coaches of American football from New York (state)
Players of American football from New York (state)